On 27 February 2020, during the peak of Operation Dawn of Idlib 2, the Russian Air Force and Syrian Air Force conducted airstrikes against a Turkish Army convoy in Balyun, Idlib Governorate. According to Turkish President Recep Tayyip Erdoğan, the strikes resulted in the deaths of 34 Turkish soldiers, while other sources close to the Turkish government gave death tolls of up to 50–100 Turkish soldiers killed, making it the single deadliest attack on Turkish forces since the start of their involvement in the Syrian Civil War. Between 36 and 60 soldiers were also wounded, of which 16 were reported to be in critical condition. The attack caused the biggest loss of life in the Turkish Army on foreign soil since the 1974 Cyprus military operation. The strikes led to the Turkish Armed Forces launching Operation Spring Shield in Idlib province.

The strikes
At around 11 a.m. on 27 February 2020, two Russian Sukhoi Su-34 and two Syrian Su-22 fighter bombers started intensive bombing raids of Hayat Tahrir al-Sham forces in the southern countryside of Syria's Idlib province. According to Russian sources, after 1 p.m., Turkish troops conducted more than 15 MANPADS attacks against the Russian and Syrian jets, with some Russian aircraft allegedly suffering damage while evading the fire.

At around 5 p.m., a 400-man Turkish mechanized infantry battalion traveling in a convoy was targeted by an airstrike on the road between al-Bara and Balyun, around five kilometers north of Kafr Nabl. A light airstrike by a Su-22 halted the convoy, after which another bombing forced 80 Turkish soldiers of the 65th Mechanised Infantry Brigade to take shelter in the nearby buildings. According to Al-Monitor, "What followed next was likely the dropping of KAB-1500L bombs...by the Russian jets", collapsing two buildings and leaving a number of soldiers under the rubble. The following day, the Russian government denied it carried out airstrikes in the area and stated it made attempts to ensure the Syrian military ceased firing to allow the evacuation of the Turkish troops, but claimed that Turkish forces should not have been in the area, where "counter-terror operations" were taking place, and that Turkey failed to notify it about the soldiers' presence in advance. The Turkish government claimed that the Russian military had already been notified of Turkish troop locations, as the two militaries had regularly liaised about these.

The Turkish Army disbanded the 65th Mechanised Infantry Brigade because of the human losses and the remaining servicemen were assigned to other units.

Turkish retaliation

According to the Turkish Ministry of National Defense, Turkey responded to the airstrikes and claimed 329 Syrian government troops "neutralized" and destroyed five helicopters, 23 tanks, 10 armored vehicles 23 artillery and howitzers, five ammunition trucks, one SA-17 and one SA-22 air defense systems, three ammunition depots, two inventory depots and one headquarter building belonging to the Syrian government, which could not be corroborated. A Syrian military official acknowledged their armored and technical vehicles were heavily targeted and that their northwestern Syria arsenal suffered significant destruction. The Syrian Observatory for Human Rights reported that 138 Syrian soldiers and militias as well as 27 other allied foreign fighters were killed by Turkish drone and artillery attacks between 28 February and 5 March. Syrian government fire killed seven Turkish soldiers and injured 21 more.

Fighter aircraft, combat drones and ground fire were used in the retaliation according to the Turkish Ministry of Defense. According to Turkish sources, Turkish combat drones entered Syrian airspace while Turkish Air Force F-16 fighter jets launched long range precision-guided munitions without entering Syrian airspace.

Turkey also deployed MIM-23 Hawk surface-to-air missiles to its border with Syria the following day.

Reactions
Protests against Russia occurred at the Russian Consulate in Istanbul the day following the strikes. The Turkish cabinet had an emergency meeting concerning the airstrikes. The Turkish government then threatened retaliation against the Syrian government for the strikes, and began to encourage Syrian refugees to enter Greece and Bulgaria. In addition, the Turkish Foreign Minister Mevlüt Çavuşoğlu spoke with the Secretary General of NATO, Jens Stoltenberg, concerning the incident.

On 29 February 2020, the Greek delegation to NATO blocked a joint declaration intended to support Turkey regarding its military operation in Syria. According to Kathimerini, the reason for the veto was because the United States, United Kingdom, France and Germany denied a Greek demand to add a paragraph regarding the issue of refugees from Turkey to Greece.

On 2 March 2020, the U.S. Secretary of Defence Mark Esper denied US air support for Turkey in Idlib. The Chairman of the US Joint Staffs General Mark Milley stated that they don't “have clear" intelligence of who was flying the planes that carried out the strike.

On 17 March 2020, the U.S Secretary of State Mike Pompeo announced new rounds of sanctions against Syrian government officials and also for the first time publicly accused Russia for being responsible for the deaths of Turkish troops in Syria, saying "We believe Russia has killed dozens of Turkish military personnel in the course of their military operation," but without naming a specific incident.

Aftermath
On 27 February 2022, during the 2022 Russian invasion of Ukraine, Ukraine bombarded Russian forces with Turkish-made Bayraktar TB2 drones at the Kherson International Airport at Chornobaivka. The Turkish embassy in Kyiv reacted to these airstrikes, describing them as "revenge" against Russia for the 2020 Baylun incident and declaring that "there is such a thing as divine justice".

References

Airstrikes during the Syrian civil war
Attacks on buildings and structures in 2020
Attacks on buildings and structures in Syria
February 2020 events in Syria
Idlib Governorate in the Syrian civil war
Military operations of the Syrian civil war in 2020
Syrian Air Force involvement in the Syrian civil war
2020 airstrikes
2020 in international relations
Ariha District